Narakkal  a village in the Vypin area situated in Ernakulam district in the Indian state of Kerala.

Demographics
Narakkal is situated at the center of Vypeen island.

Here is some general information about the demographics of Narakkal:

Narakkal is a village located in the Vypin area of Ernakulam district in the southern state of Kerala, India. According to the 2011 Census of India, Narakkal had a population of 33,030 people, with a male population of 15,735 and a female population of 17,295.

The literacy rate of Narakkal is higher than the national average, with a literacy rate of 96.36% (as of 2011). The majority of the population speaks Malayalam, which is the official language of Kerala, and some people also speak English and Hindi.

Narakkal has a mixed population of people from various religious backgrounds. The majority of the population is Hindu, followed by Muslims and Christians. The village is known for its rich cultural heritage and traditional festivals, which are celebrated with great enthusiasm by people of all religions.

The main occupation of the people in Narakkal is fishing, and the village is famous for its fishing industry. However, with the growth of tourism, many people have also started working in the hospitality industry and other related businesses.

Landmarks
 Fish Farm and Aqua Tourism Centre, Vypin
 Narakkal Panchayath
 Village Office
 Police Station
 Kerala State Electricity Board office (KSEB)
 Krishi Bhavan
 Post Office
 Jai Hind Play Ground
 Government Register Office
 Sree Sakthidhara Temple
 Sree Balabhadra Temple
 Govt. Fisheries U.P. School
 Surya Wooden Industry
 Western Jewellery- Jewellers
 Bakers Corner- Dominant Bakers
 St. Mary's Church
 Majestic Talkies

Education
 Little Flower High School
 Marello Public School
 Talent Public School
 GVHSS Narakkal
 St.Joseph Public School

Religion
Some religious people And there are a good percentage of atheists.

References

Villages in Ernakulam district
Suburbs of Kochi